Columbia Heights is a neighborhood in the village of East Galesburg in Knox County, Illinois.

References

Unincorporated communities in Illinois